Pacradooni Kaloost Vartan was the son of a poor Armenian tailor, he was born in Istanbul in 1835 and founded the Nazareth Hospital, the first hospital in Ottoman Galilee.

Early life

Vartan attended Constantinople's first American missionary school. He joined the British army, serving in the Crimea as an interpreter, but after witnessing the dreadful inadequacies of battlefield medical facilities he resolved to become a surgeon.

Medical training and mission in Palestine

After his initial Crimean experiences he traveled to Edinburgh where he trained as a doctor under the auspices of the Edinburgh Medical Missionary Society (EMMS). He married Mary Anne Stewart, a Scottish nurse, and immediately after the wedding he and his bride left for Palestine.

Vartan's work was sponsored by the EMMS to whom he reported every quarter. With fundraising led by William Thomson, he was able to start the Nazareth Hospital.

When he arrived in Nazareth in 1861, average life expectancy was 22 years for males and 24 years for females. The first floor of the house he rented housed the dispensary, with a separate room for four beds. That was in the area of the Old Suuq today. The extended house eventually became inadequate and, after many difficulties, the land on which the present hospital stands was purchased in 1906.

Patients came from Nazareth and the surrounding countryside for medical care. In addition, hospital staff ran clinics in the villages neighboring Nazareth. When the Free Church of Scotland mission wanted advice about starting their own missionary work, they asked him.

The Vartan family were members of Christ Church, Nazareth. John Zeller, the pastor of the church, assisted Vartan with his work in founding the Nazareth Hospital.

Vartan died in 1908.
An iris ('Iris vartanii') was named by Sir Michael Foster after Dr. Vartan.

References

1835 births
1908 deaths
Christian medical missionaries
Palestinian people of Armenian descent
Armenian Protestant missionaries
Physicians from Istanbul
Armenians from the Ottoman Empire
Armenian expatriates in the United Kingdom
People from Nazareth
Protestant missionaries in Palestine (region)
Protestant missionaries in the Ottoman Empire